The Little Busters! anime television series is based on the visual novel Little Busters! and its expanded version Little Busters! Ecstasy by the Japanese visual novel brand Key. The episodes, produced by the animation studio J.C.Staff, are directed by Yoshinobu Yamakawa, written by Michiru Shimada, and features character design by chief animator Haruko Iizuka who based the designs on Itaru Hinoue's and Na-Ga's original concepts. The story follows a group of childhood friends (Riki Naoe, Rin Natsume, Kyousuke Natsume, Masato Inohara and Kengo Miyazawa) now attending high school called the Little Busters, as they decide to form a baseball team. Riki, who is diagnosed with narcolepsy, is tasked to recruit more girls in preparation for a baseball game, and he bonds with each of them on account of their internal conflicts. Meanwhile, Rin gets mysterious letters from her cat Lennon to complete various tasks in order to learn the "secret to this world".

The 26-episode series aired between October 6, 2012 and April 6, 2013 on the Tokyo MX television network in Japan. It aired at later dates than Tokyo MX on AT-X, BS11, Gunma TV, MBS, Tochigi TV, TV Aichi and TV Kanagawa. The series was also streamed by Crunchyroll with English subtitles. The anime series was released on a set of nine BD/DVD compilation volumes between December 26, 2012 and August 28, 2013 by Warner Home Video in limited and regular editions. A BD containing an original video animation (OVA) episode was available for mail order to those who bought all nine limited edition BD/DVD volumes. The anime has been licensed by Sentai Filmworks, and two BD/DVD collections were released on November 19, 2013 and April 22, 2014.

A 13-episode second season, titled Little Busters! Refrain, aired between October 5 and December 28, 2013 on AT-X; it aired at later dates than Tokyo MX on BS11, MBS, TV Aichi and Tokyo MX. The episodes were released on seven BD/DVD compilation volumes between January 29 and July 30, 2014 by Warner Home Video in limited and regular editions. Refrain has also been licensed by Sentai Filmworks, and it was released on BD and DVD on January 20, 2015. A series of eight OVA episodes titled Little Busters! EX, based on the Ecstasy version of the game, are included on the BD/DVD releases of Refrain. Sentai Filmworks also licensed Little Busters! EX.

The first anime series makes use of two main pieces of theme music: the opening theme "Little Busters! (TV animation ver.)" and the ending theme "Alicemagic (TV animation ver.)". Both songs are sung by Rita and are remixes of the theme songs featured in the original Little Busters! visual novel. Two additional ending themes by Rita include the original version of "Alicemagic" used in episodes 6 and 18, and  used in episodes 14 and 23.

Three additional ending themes used in Refrain include "Song for friends" by Rita used in episodes three, eight and nine; "Hanabi" by Lia used in episode six; and "Little Busters! (Little Jumper Ver.)" by Rita used in episode 13. Two songs are also used as insert songs:  by Rita in episode 11, and "Song for friends" in episode 13.

The OVA series Little Busters! EX also has two main pieces of theme music: the opening theme "Little Busters! EX" by Rita and the ending theme  by Suzuyu. The rest of the soundtrack for the entire anime series is sampled from albums released for the visual novels, Little Busters! Original Soundtrack and Little Busters! Ecstasy Tracks, and the Little Busters! Refrain Original Soundtrack.

Little Busters!

Little Busters! Refrain

Little Busters! EX

References

External links
Little Busters! anime official website 

Key (company)
Lists of anime episodes